Oliveros may refer to:

Places 
 Oliveros, Santa Fe, a town in Argentina

People with the surname 
 Chris Oliveros, founder of the publishing company Drawn and Quarterly
 Déborah Oliveros, Mexican mathematician
 Pauline Oliveros (1932–2016), American accordionist and composer

Other uses 
 Oliveros cigars, a brand manufactured by Boutique Blends Cigars since 1996